Jean-Louis Rosier (14 June 1925 – 1 July 2011) was the son of Louis Rosier. Together they won the 24 Hours of Le Mans in 1950, of which all except for 2 laps were driven by Louis Rosier. The Charade Circuit near Clermont-Ferrand is also named after them.

Complete 24 Hours of Le Mans results

References

French racing drivers
24 Hours of Le Mans drivers
24 Hours of Le Mans winning drivers
1925 births
2011 deaths
World Sportscar Championship drivers